Michael Gibson (born 1 March 1963 in Australia) is an Australian soccer player who represented the Australia national soccer team on 7 (1 A-International and 6 B-Internationals) occasions.

Club career
Over the course of his career Gibson turned out for St George Saints, Blacktown City Demons, Newcastle Breakers, Sydney Olympic, Bonnyrigg White Eagles, Marconi Stallions, Sydney United, Penrith City SC, Parramatta Power, Schofields Scorpions and Canterbury-Marrickville. Overall, he played 288 times in the Australian National Soccer League (NSL).

International career
Gibson represented his nation on 7 occasions between 1985 and 1989 (1 A-International and 6 B-Internationals). His sole A International appearance for Australia was on 9 March 1988 in an Olympic Games qualification match against Taiwan at Hindmarsh Stadium in Adelaide. Australia won the match 3–2.

References

External links
 
 http://www.ozfootball.net/ark/Players/G/GI.html

Blacktown City FC players
Sydney Olympic FC players
Bonnyrigg White Eagles FC players
Marconi Stallions FC players
Sydney United 58 FC players
Parramatta Power players
Australia international soccer players
Australia B international soccer players
Australian soccer players
Footballers at the 1988 Summer Olympics
Olympic soccer players of Australia
1963 births
Living people
Place of birth missing (living people)
Association football goalkeepers
Newcastle Breakers FC players